General elections were held in Saint Vincent and the Grenadines on 7 December 2005. The result was a repeat of the 2001 general election with the ruling Unity Labour Party retaining all twelve of its seats and the opposition New Democratic Party retaining its three. However, the NDP saw a nearly 4-point swing in its share of the popular vote. Ralph Gonsalves remained Prime Minister.

Campaign
A total of 34 candidates contested the elections; the Unity Labour Party and the New Democratic Party both fielded candidates in all 15 constituencies, whilst the Green Party nominated four candidates.

Results

References

External links
Vincentian elections a tough fight BBC

Saint Vincent
Elections in Saint Vincent and the Grenadines
2005 in Saint Vincent and the Grenadines